John Cole (born c.1376) of Nethway in the parish of Brixham in Devon, was twice elected a Member of Parliament for Devon, in 1417 and 1423.

Sources
Biography of COLE, John IV (b.c.1376), of Nethway, Devon, published in History of Parliament: House of Commons 1386-1421, ed. J.S. Roskell, L. Clark, C. Rawcliffe., 1993

References

1376 births
Year of death unknown
English MPs 1417
High Sheriffs of Devon
Members of the Parliament of England (pre-1707) for Devon
English MPs 1423
People from Brixham